Matthew Zook is an American geographer and professor in the Department of Geography, University of Kentucky.  He studies the geography of the Internet, the GeoWeb, economic geography and domain names  In 2009 Matthew Zook and Mark Graham cofounded the FloatingSheep blog to understand the interactions between the GeoWeb and the offline world. In 2011 Zook cofounded the New Mappings Collaboratory at the University of Kentucky to focus on public engagement in Lexington, 'big data' and user-generated Internet content, as well as the affordances of place-based thinking, analysis, and representation.

Early and personal life
Matthew Zook was born to mother Bonnie Zook and father Gordon Zook. Zook has three sisters. He graduated high school in Goshen, Indiana and later continued his education from Earlham College where he graduated in 1989. Zook continued on to his Masters education at Cornell University where he finished in 1995. August 17, 1996 he married Eva Ensmann whom he met while studying together at Cornell. Zook received Lasik eye surgery between 2007 and 2008. Zook was ordained as clergy of the Church of the Flying Spaghetti Monster in 2012.

Education
Ph.D., University of California, Berkeley - Dept. of City and Regional Planning. 2000
M.R.P., Cornell University (Ithaca, New York) 1995.
B.A., Earlham College (Richmond, Indiana) 1989

Research
Much of Zook's early work is on how economic factors have influenced and shaped the internet and the ICT industry (Information, Communications and Technology). He discusses how the infrastructure of the ICT industry was constructed upon an existing network of Venture Capital [grounded capital]. This research showed how despite the image of the internet being a tool of egalitarian communication and commerce, the resources of production were creating a digital divide.

His work as an economic geographer contributed to a greater understanding of the expansion and impact of Walmart in USA. Zook also created a heat map generated from the data being collected from the Price of Weed project, which was featured in Wired.

His more recent research looks at the GeoWeb. Although the transition was gradual, what seems to have started with mapping content creation has turned into a fascination with mapping not only user generated content, but specifically geo-coded data.

Awards

 University of Kentucky Provost's Outstanding Teaching Award (2013)

 Maps made by Matthew Zook

In 2006, Zook provided expert testimony about the Geography of Internet Pornography in a federal court case American Civil Liberties Union vs. Alberto Gonzales

 In 1995 Zook won the UC Berkeley Chancellor Fellowship.  
 In 2007 and 2013 Matthew Zook won a Fulbright Fellowship to study in Estonia.
 In 2012, Zook performed as Mother Ginger in the Lexington Ballet.  His performance was noted for its grace and his facial hair.
 In 2015, Zook was named the Kentucky State Geographer by Governor Steve Beshear.

Publications

References

American geographers
University of Kentucky faculty
Living people
Year of birth missing (living people)